A border town is a town or city close to the boundary between two countries, states, or regions. Usually the term implies that the nearness to the border is one of the things the place is most famous for. With close proximities to a different country, diverse cultural traditions can have certain influence to the place. Border towns can have highly cosmopolitan communities, a feature they share with port cities, as traveling and trading often go through the town. They can also be flashpoints for international conflicts, especially when the two countries have territorial disputes.

List of border towns and cities

Transcontinental

Asia/Africa
 El-Qantarah el-Sharqiyya, Egypt

Asia/Europe
 Istanbul, Turkey
 Atyrau, Kazakhstan
 Oral, Kazakhstan
Magnitogorsk, Russia

In Africa
 Aflao, Ghana
 Badme, Eritrea
 Bangui, Central African Republic
 Beni Ensar, Morocco
 Ceuta, Spain
 Cocobeach, Gabon
 Fnideq, Morocco
 Kinshasa/Brazzaville (Democratic Republic of the Congo/Republic of the Congo)
 Lomé, Togo
 Mandera, Kenya
 Melilla, Spain
 Moyale, Ethiopia
 Oujda, Morocco
 Walvis Bay, Namibia (until 1994)

In the Americas

In Central America
 Benque Viejo del Carmen, Belize (Belize/Guatemala)
 Chetumal (Mexico/Belize)
 Ciudad Hidalgo, Chiapas and Ciudad Tecun Uman (Mexico/Guatemala)
 Corozal Town, Belize (Belize/Mexico)
 Melchor de Mencos, Guatemala (Belize/Guatemala)

In North America

United States/Canada

Within Canada 
 Lloydminster, a single municipality on the Alberta/Saskatchewan border
 Flin Flon, Manitoba, Creighton, Saskatchewan, and Flin Flon, Saskatchewan
 Ottawa, Ontario and Gatineau, Quebec

United States/Mexico

Within the United States

In South America
 Alberdi, Paraguay and Formosa, Argentina
 Assis Brasil, Brazil; Bolpebra, Bolivia; and Iñapari, Peru
 Brasiléia/Epitaciolândia, Brazil and Cobija, Bolivia
 Corumbá, Brazil and Puerto Suárez, Bolivia
 Chuí, Brazil and Chuy, Uruguay
 Cúcuta, Colombia and San Antonio del Táchira, Venezuela
 Pacaraima, Brazil and Santa Elena de Uairén, Venezuela
 Jaguarão, Brazil and Río Branco, Uruguay
 Paso de los Libres, Argentina and Uruguaiana, Brazil
 Ponta Porã, Brazil and Pedro Juan Caballero, Paraguay
 Posadas, Argentina and Encarnación, Paraguay
 Puerto Iguazú, Argentina; Foz do Iguaçu, Brazil; and Ciudad del Este, Paraguay
 Santana do Livramento, Brazil and Rivera, Uruguay
 Santo Tomé, Argentina and São Borja, Brazil
 Tabatinga, Brazil and Leticia, Colombia
 Tulcán, Ecuador and Ipiales, Colombia
 Yacuíba, Bolivia and Salvador Mazza, Argentina

Within Colombia
 Soacha, Cundinamarca and Bogotá
 Yondó, Antioquía and Barrancabermeja, Santander
 Puerto Triunfo, Antioquía and Puerto Boyacá, Boyacá and
  Cartago, Valle del Cauca and Puerto Caldas, Pereira, Risaralda
 Palermo Sitionuevo, Magdalena and Barranquilla, Atlántico 
 Girardot and Ricaurte, Cundinamarca with Flandes, Tolima
 Puerto Salgar, Cundinamarca and La Dorada, Caldas
 Barbosa, Santander and Moniquirá, Boyacá

In Asia

Afghanistan/Iran
 Islam Qala/Taybad
 Zaranj/Zehak

Afghanistan/Pakistan
 Spin Boldak/Chaman
 Torkham/Torkham

Afghanistan/Turkmenistan
 Torghundi/Serhetabat

Afghanistan/Uzbekistan
 Hairatan/Termez

Azerbaijan/Iran
 Astara/Astara
 Julfa/Jolfa

Bhutan/India
 Phuntsholing/Jaigaon

Brunei/Malaysia
 Tutong/Limbang
 Temburong District/Lawas
 Temburong District/Limbang
 Kuala Belait/Miri

China

China/Hong Kong
 Shatoujiao/Sha Tau Kok

China/Kazakhstan
 Alashankou/Dostyk
 Khorgas/Korgas

China/Laos
 Mohan/Muang Namo

China/Macau SAR
 Gongbei Port of Entry/Portas do Cerco
 Hengqin/Cotai

China/Mongolia
 Erenhot/Zamyn-Üüd

China/Myanmar
 Ruili/Muse

China/Nepal
 Zhangmu/Tatopani, Sindhupalchok
 Gyirong Town/Timure

China/North Korea
 Changbai/Hyesan
 Dandong/Sinuiju
 Ji'an, Jilin/Manpo

China/Russia
 Heihe/Blagoveshchensk
 Manzhouli/Zabaykalsk
 Suifenhe/Pogranichny
 Yanji/Khasan
 Raohe/Bikin

China/Taiwan
 Xiamen/Kinmen
 Lianjiang/Lienchiang

China/Vietnam
 Dongxing/Mong Cai
 Hekou/Lao Cai
 Youyiguan/Lang Son

Cyprus/Northern Cyprus
 Lefkosia/Lefkoşa 
 (Note: the Republic of Northern Cyprus is a de facto state with almost no international recognition, with Turkey being the only UN member state to recognize its sovereignty.)

Egypt/Gaza
 Rafah, Egypt/Rafah
 (Note: Gaza forms part of the State of Palestine, a state with substantial, but not general, international recognition.)

India

India/Bangladesh
 Petrapole-Benapole
 Karimganj–Beanibazar Upazila
 Malda–Rajshahi
 West Garo Hills–Bakshiganj
 Tura–Nalitabari Upazila
 Shillong–Sylhet
 Agartala–Dhaka
 Santirbazar–Feni

India/Myanmar
 Moreh, India/Tamu, Myanmar

India/Nepal
 Panitanki/Kakarbhitta
 Jogbani/Biratnagar
 Raxaul/Birgunj
 Nautanwa/Siddharthanagar
 Rupaidiha/Nepalgunj
 Banbasa/Bhimdatta

India/Pakistan
 Amritsar
 Ferozepur
 Fazilka
 Lahore

Indonesia/Malaysia
 Entikong, Sanggau Regency, West Kalimantan/Tebedu, Serian, Sarawak

Iran/Iraq
 Basra

Iran/Turkmenistan
 Sarakhs/Serakhs

Israel/Egypt
 Eilat/Taba

Israel/Jordan
 Eilat/Aqaba

Laos/Thailand
 Ban Dongphosy/Nong Khai
 Vientiane/Udon Thani

Malaysia/Singapore
 Johor Bahru/Woodlands
 Tanjung Kupang/Tuas

Malaysia/Thailand
 Bukit Kayu Hitam/Sadao
 Padang Besar, Perlis/Padang Besar, Songkhla
 Pengkalan Hulu/Betong
 Pengkalan Kubur/Tak Bai
 Rantau Panjang/Sungai Golok
 Wang Kelian/Wang Prachan, Satun

Mongolia/Russia
 Altanbulag/Kyakhta

Myanmar/Thailand
 Myawaddy/Mae Sot
 Tachilek/Mae Sai

Turkey/Syria
 Nusaybin/Qamishli
 Şenyurt/Al-Darbasiyah
 Ceylanpınar/Ras al-Ayn
 Akçakale/Tell Abyad
 Mürşitpınar/Kobanî
 Karkamış/Jarabulus

In Europe

Alps and France/Germany
 Geneva (Switzerland/France)
 Mulhouse (France/Germany)
 Saarbrücken, Germany (France/Germany)
 Saint Louis/Weil am Rhein/Basel (France/Germany/Switzerland)
 Strasbourg/Kehl (France/Germany)
 Como/Chiasso (Italy/Switzerland)
 Gorizia/Nova Gorica (Italy/Slovenia)
Konstanz/Kreuzlingen (Germany/Switzerland)

Baltic states
 Ainaži (Latvia/Estonia)
 Narva, Estonia/Ivangorod, Russia
 Valga, Estonia/Valka, Latvia
 Panemunė, Lithuania/Sovetsk, Russia

Caucasus
 Tsandryphsh/Vesyoloye (Georgia/Russia)
Sarpi/Sarp (Georgia/Turkey)

Central Europe
 East Berlin/West Berlin (East Germany/West Germany, 1949–1990)
 Bratislava, Slovakia (borders both Austria and Hungary)
 Brest, Belarus/Terespol (Belarus/Poland)
 Chop/Záhony/Čierna nad Tisou (Ukraine/Hungary/Slovakia)
 Cieszyn/Český Těšín (Poland/Czech Republic)
 Esztergom/Štúrovo (Hungary/Slovakia)
 Forst/Zasieki (Germany/Poland)
 Frankfurt (Oder)/Słubice (Germany/Poland)
 Gmünd/České Velenice (Austria/Czech Republic)
 Görlitz/Zgorzelec (Germany/Poland)
 Guben/Gubin (Germany/Poland)
 Hodonín/Holíč (Czech Republic/Slovakia)
 Komárom/Komárno (Hungary/Slovakia)
 Küstrin-Kietz/Kostrzyn nad Odrą (Germany/Poland)
 Passau (Germany/Austria)
 Prudnik (Poland/Czech Republic)
 Sátoraljaújhely/Slovenské Nové Mesto (Hungary/Slovakia)
 Vyšné Nemecké/Uzhhorod (Slovakia/Ukraine)

Iberian Peninsula
 Gibraltar / La Línea de la Concepción (United Kingdom / Spain)

France / Spain
 Bourg-Madame / Puigcerdà 
 Hendaye / Irún 
 Le Perthus / Els Límits 

Portugal / Spain
 Elvas / Badajoz 
 Valença do Minho / Tui

Ireland/United Kingdom
 Derry (Northern Ireland/Republic of Ireland)
 Dundalk (Republic of Ireland/Northern Ireland)
 Newry (Northern Ireland/Republic of Ireland)
 Strabane (Northern Ireland/Republic of Ireland)

Within the  United Kingdom

England/Scotland
 Berwick-upon-Tweed
 Carlisle
 Coldstream
 Eyemouth
 Gretna
 Longtown

England/Wales
 Bishop's Castle
 Chepstow
 Chester
 Chirk
 Hay-on-Wye
 Kington
 Knighton
 Monmouth
 Montgomery
 Oswestry
 Presteigne
 Saltney
 Whitchurch
 Wrexham

Low countries/Germany

Romania/Bulgaria
 Giurgiu, Romania/Ruse, Bulgaria
 Călărași, Romania/Silistra, Bulgaria
 Calafat, Romania/Vidin, Bulgaria

Nordic countries
 Halden, Norway/Strömstad, Sweden
 Copenhagen, Denmark/Malmö, Sweden
 Padborg, Denmark/Flensburg, Germany
 Tornio, Finland/Haparanda, Sweden
 Imatra, Finland/Svetogorsk, Russia
 Karesuando, Sweden/Karesuvanto, Finland

Southern Europe
 Beausoleil, France/Monaco, Monaco
 Gorizia, Italy/Nova Gorica, Slovenia
 Lavena Ponte Tresa, Italy/Ponte Tresa, Switzerland
 Menton, France/Ventimiglia, Italy
 Rimini, Italy/Serravalle, San Marino
 Rome, Italy/Vatican City, Vatican
 Trieste (Italy/Slovenia)
 Koper (Slovenia/Italy)
 Slavonski Brod, Croatia/Brod, Bosnia-Herzegovina
 Županja, Croatia/Orašje, Bosnia-Herzegovina

In Oceania

Australia within
 Albury, New South Wales and Wodonga, Victoria
 Bordertown, South Australia
 Canberra, Australian Capital Territory and Queanbeyan, New South Wales
 Corowa, New South Wales and Wahgunyah, Victoria
 Echuca, Victoria and Moama, New South Wales
 Mildura, Victoria 
 Mulwala, New South Wales and Yarrawonga, Victoria
 Tweed Heads, New South Wales and Gold Coast, Queensland
 Mungindi, New South Wales and Queensland
 Wallangarra, Queensland and Jennings, New South Wales

Indonesia/Papua New Guinea

 Jayapura, Papua (province), Indonesia

Vanimo, Papua New Guinea

See also
 Border towns in the United States with portmanteau names
 Cross-border town naming
 Divided cities
 Transborder agglomeration
 List of seaports
 List of Mexico–United States border crossings
 List of Canada–United States border crossings

Borders
International border crossings